These are the results for the girls' 10m platform event at the 2018 Summer Youth Olympics.

Results

References

 Preliminary Results 
 Final Results 

Diving at the 2018 Summer Youth Olympics